Gamer's Guide to Pretty Much Everything is an American comedy television series created by Devin Bunje and Nick Stanton that aired on Disney XD from July 22, 2015 to January 2, 2017. The series stars Cameron Boyce, Murray Wyatt Rundus, Felix Avitia, and Sophie Reynolds.

Premise 
Conor is a professional video game player who goes by the name of Kid Fury. When he breaks his thumb during the singles final round of the World Gaming Pro Championship, his sponsors withdraw every free item that he was given upon cutting all ties with him, and he starts school again. Upon befriending Wendell, Franklin, and Ashley, Conor plans to enlist their help for the teams part of the upcoming World Gaming Pro Championship.

Cast

Main 
 Cameron Boyce as Conor
 Murray Wyatt Rundus as Wendell
 Felix Avitia as Franklin
 Sophie Reynolds as Ashley

Recurring 
 Joe Hursley as Mr. Spanks
 Paula Sorge as Principal Nordahl
 Lauren Pritchard as Janice
 Boogie as Billy (season 1)

Production 
On October 14, 2015, it was announced that production on the first season had been finished. On November 20, 2015, Disney XD renewed the series for a second season. On January 5, 2017, series co-creator and executive producer Devin Bunje and various members of the cast announced on social media that the series had been canceled.

Episodes

Series overview

Season 1 (2015–16)

Season 2 (2016–17)

Broadcast 
In Canada, the series premiered on Disney Channel September 5, 2015, and moved to Disney XD on December 1, 2015.

Ratings 
 

| link2             = #Season 2 (2016–17)
| episodes2         = 15
| start2            = 
| end2              = 
| startrating2      = 0.24
| endrating2        = 0.37
| viewers2          = |2}} 
}}

References

External links 
 

2010s American children's comedy television series
2015 American television series debuts
2017 American television series endings
Disney XD original programming
English-language television shows
Television series by It's a Laugh Productions
Television shows about video games